Primary anemia may refer to:

Hyperchromic anemia or chlorosis
Pernicious anemia